is a district located in Nara Prefecture, Japan.

As of 2003, the district has an estimated population of 11,427 and a density of 103.46 persons per km2. The total area is 110.45 km2.

Towns and villages 
Yamazoe

Merger 
On April 1, 2005, the village of Tsuge merged into the city of Nara.

Districts in Nara Prefecture